Rutelini is a tribe of shining leaf chafers in the family Scarabaeidae. There are about 14 genera and at least 40 described species in Rutelini.

Genera
 Calomacraspis Bates, 1888
 Chrysina Kirby, 1828
 Cotalpa Burmeister, 1844
 Ectinoplectron Ohaus, 1915
 Homoiosternus Ohaus, 1901
 Parabyrsopolis Ohaus, 1915
 Parachrysina Bates, 1888
 Paracotalpa Ohaus, 1915
 Parastasia Westwood, 1842
 Pelidnota MacLeay, 1819
 Plesiosternus Morón, 1983
 Pseudocotalpa Hardy, 1971
 Rutela Latreille, 1802
 Rutelisca Bates, 1888

References

Further reading

 
 
 
 

Rutelinae